Fly Creek is an outer rural locality in Darwin.

References

External links

Suburbs of Darwin, Northern Territory